Ephebe  (from the Greek ephebos ἔφηβος  (plural: epheboi ἔφηβοι),  anglicised as ephebe (plural: ephebes), or Latinate ephebus (plural: ephebi) is the term for an adolescent male. In ancient Greek society and mythology, an ephebos was a boy, aged 17–18, who went through a period of initiation that included military training.

Ephebe may also refer to:

Ephebe (lichen), a genus of lichen in the family Lichinaceae
Ephebus (personal name)
The fictional Discworld country Ephebe
Kritios Boy, an ancient Greek sculpture, also called Ephebe of Kritios
Marathon Boy, an ancient Greek sculpture, also called Ephebe of Marathon
A novel, Efebos, only part of which survives, by Polish composer Karol Szymanowski

See also
 Ephebia, official institutions in Greek city-states for training young men of that age 
 Ephebophilia, sexual attraction to adolescents
 Ephebiphobia, fear of adolescents